Torridal is a V-shaped valley in Agder county, Norway. The valley passes through portions of the municipalities of Kristiansand and Vennesla in an area that was historically a part of the former Oddernes municipality. Today it includes areas north of the city center of Kristiansand on both riverbanks of the river Otra. The local name Torridalselva (meaning Torridal river) is commonly used for the river's lower course from Mosby to the sea.

The valley includes the areas of Sødal, Skråstad, Lian, Hagen, and Glattetre on the east side of the river and Strai, Hommeren, Aukland, Mosby, and Høie on the west side.  The districts of Espestøl, Hemmes, Mestad, Aurebekk, Rypestøl, and Kulia are also part of the valley, although they don't lie directly along the river. The Mosby and Strai areas are fairly densely populated, and the Torridal Church lies between those two villages.  The Torridal sporting venue has facilities outdoors and indoors in Torridalshallen. 

Norwegian National Road 9 (Setesdalsveien) and the Sørlandet Line both run along the west side of the river Otra, through the Torridal valley.

Norwegian County Road 1 ("Sødalssida") runs along the east bank of Otra.

References 

Valleys of Agder
Geography of Kristiansand
Vennesla